Nora Radcliffe (born 4 March 1946, Aberdeen) is a former Scottish Liberal Democrat politician.  She was the Member of the Scottish Parliament (MSP) for Gordon from 1999 to 2007. During her two terms in the Scottish Parliament she held various party spokespersonships, most frequently the Scottish Liberal Democrats' Equal Opportunities, Environment and Rural Development briefs.

Parliamentary career
It is her work for the environment, campaigns to increase the provision of NHS dentistry in the North East of Scotland and her attempts to improve transport infrastructure in the area that Radcliffe was best known for during her time in as Gordon's MSP.

In the 2007 Scottish Parliament elections, she once more contested Gordon, but was defeated by Alex Salmond, the leader of the Scottish National Party, who won 14,650 votes to her 12,588.

Awards
Radcliffe was awarded the "Friend for Life" award by the Equality Network in recognition of her work as the Scottish Parliament's first Reporter on Sexual Orientation Issues. This award is made to a non-LGBT person who has worked for equality.

References

External links 
 

1946 births
Living people
People from Aberdeen
Alumni of the University of Aberdeen
Liberal Democrat MSPs
Members of the Scottish Parliament 1999–2003
Members of the Scottish Parliament 2003–2007
Female members of the Scottish Parliament
20th-century Scottish women politicians